People's Democracy is the English weekly newspaper of the Communist Party of India (Marxist). Prakash Karat, CPI(M) Polit Bureau member is the editor of the newspaper. The journal has six editions from New Delhi, Kolkata, Hyderabad, Chennai, Agartala, and Kochi.

History
People's Democracy was founded in 1965 with Jyoti Basu as the founding editor. It had a circulation of about 25,000 copies in 2006.

Former editors
 Jyoti Basu
 Sunil Maitra
 Sitaram Yechury

Columns

Economic notes
This column discusses economic developments and issues in both the international and national arena. Authors who writes here include Prabhat Patnaik and C. P. Chandrashekhar.

Policy Matters
Authors include Archana Prasad.

Science and Development Issues
This section covers current technological developments with social impacts authored by Prabir Purkayastha, Raghu, and others.

Working Class Issues
Worker's movements, trade union activities and issues concerning the working class are detailed here.

International
International events and issues. Authors include Yohannan Chemerapally.

Other columns include Current Issues and Book Reviews.

References

External links
 
 First editorial of People's Democracy by Com. Jyoti Basu

English-language communist newspapers
Communist Party of India (Marxist)
Communist periodicals published in India
English-language newspapers published in India
Publications established in 1965
1965 establishments in India